Nitronic is the trade name for a collection of nitrogen-strengthened stainless steel alloys. They are austenitic stainless steels.

History
Nitronic alloys were developed by Armco Steel. The first of these alloys, Nitronic 40, was introduced in 1961. Since 2022, the trademark has been owned by Cleveland-Cliffs Steel Corp., successor to AK Steel.  Electralloy is the licensed producer in North America for a wide range of Nitronic products.

The Nitronic name is due to the addition of nitrogen to the alloy, which enhances the strength internally rather than being nitrided on the surface, as some steel are treated. The nitrogen is homogeneous throughout the material. Nitronic materials have about twice the yield strength of 304L and 316L.

Uses today
Nitronic 30 is used to lighten transportation vehicles. Buses and railcars benefit from the high strength-to-weight ratio for energy savings, with less steel used for the application. Nitronic 40 is used in the aerospace industry as hydraulic tubing.  Nitronic 40 has unusually good performance characteristics at ultralow temperatures, which offers a "design advantage" over comparable alloys.
Nitronic 50 is used in marine environments, including boat shafting and solid rod rigging. Nitronic 60 and a similar alloy Gall-Tough were specifically developed to have superior resistance to galling, a form of wear caused by adhesion between sliding surfaces, and metal-to-metal wear.

Composition
Nitronic alloys have widely varying compositions, but all are predominantly iron, chromium, manganese and nitrogen.

References

Superalloys
Aerospace materials
Chromium alloys